Emmanuel Sarki (born 26 December 1987) is a  footballer who plays as winger for Polish club Huragan Waksmund. Born in Nigeria, he played for the Haiti national team.

Career 
Sarki began his career at Grays International FC, before moving to Lyn Oslo in 2004. Subsequently, he went on trial to Chelsea and trained there for a few months. In early 2006, he became a Chelsea player, but quickly was loaned out to KVC Westerlo.

After his contract expired with Waasland-Beveren, he trialled with Wisła Kraków and subsequently signed a two-year deal with them with an option for a third year. He made his debut against Polonia Warsaw as a substitute in the 56th minute. He joined AEL Limassol after his contract with Wisła Kraków ran out following a knee injury which ruled him out in the 2015-16 season.

On 17 March 2019, Sarki joined Polish fourth division club Węgrzcanka Węgrzce Wielkie. Four months later, he moved to Odra Wodzisław.

International career 
Sarki was member of the Nigeria national under-17 football team at 2003 FIFA U-17 World Championship in Finland and 2003 African Under-17 Championship. In 2007, he played for the Nigeria national under-20 football team at African U-20 Championship, where he scored two goals for the eventual runners up.

In August 2014, Sarki was called up to the Haiti national team, qualifying because his maternal grandfather was born there. At the time of this call-up, Sarki was quoted as saying that he had twice been invited to pay some money to be involved with the Nigeria national team but had declined to pay.

Sarki was involved in Haiti's third-place finish in the 2014 Caribbean Cup, making his debut against Antigua and Barbuda and assisted Kervens Belfort in a 3-0 win over Martinique.

References

External links
 Profile at eurosport.com
 
 

1987 births
Living people
Nigerian footballers
Citizens of Haiti through descent
Haitian footballers
Sportspeople from Kaduna
Lyn Fotball players
Eliteserien players
Chelsea F.C. players
K.V.C. Westerlo players
Wisła Kraków players
AEL Limassol players
Partizán Bardejov players
Belgian Pro League players
Israeli Premier League players
Challenger Pro League players
Ekstraklasa players
Cypriot First Division players
2. Liga (Slovakia) players
Nigerian expatriate footballers
Expatriate footballers in Norway
Expatriate footballers in England
Expatriate footballers in Belgium
Expatriate footballers in Israel
Expatriate footballers in Poland
Expatriate footballers in Cyprus
Expatriate footballers in Northern Cyprus
Expatriate footballers in Slovakia
Nigerian expatriate sportspeople in Norway
Nigerian expatriate sportspeople in England
Nigerian expatriate sportspeople in Belgium
Nigerian expatriate sportspeople in Israel
Nigerian expatriate sportspeople in Poland
Haitian expatriate sportspeople in Poland
Haitian expatriate sportspeople in Cyprus
Haitian expatriate sportspeople in Northern Cyprus
Haitian expatriate sportspeople in Slovakia
Association football midfielders
Haiti international footballers
2014 Caribbean Cup players
Haitian people of Nigerian descent
Nigerian people of Haitian descent
Sportspeople of Haitian descent